The Ely State Theater is a historic movie theater in Ely, Minnesota, United States.  It was designed by Liebenberg and Kaplan in Streamline Moderne style and built in 1936.  The theater was listed on the National Register of Historic Places in 2015.  It was nominated for epitomizing the small-town commissions of Liebenberg and Kaplan, the leading movie theater designers in the Upper Midwest during the Golden Age of Hollywood.

The Ely State Theater closed in 2008 due to the Great Recession.  The building quickly fell into disrepair.  Restoration efforts began in 2014 and reopened December 2019 with local live theater in a showing of "The Quiltmaker's Gift." The first film in over a decade screened on June 24th, 2020. The film was Ferris Bueller's Day Off. Ely's Historic State Theater is now open to the public and is a cinema and live event venue with an attached concessions area and second theater in the adjacent  building. There is a one-bedroom apartment above the lobby and is available as a short-term rental on Air B&B.

See also
 National Register of Historic Places listings in St. Louis County, Minnesota

Gallery

References

External links
 Ely State Theater

1936 establishments in Minnesota
Buildings and structures in Ely, Minnesota
Cinemas and movie theaters in Minnesota
Moderne architecture in Minnesota
National Register of Historic Places in St. Louis County, Minnesota
Theatres completed in 1936
Theatres on the National Register of Historic Places in Minnesota